"Only Mama Knows" is the fourth episode of the eleventh season of the American television medical drama Grey's Anatomy, and is the 224th episode overall. It aired on October 16, 2014 on ABC in the United States. The episode was written by Mark Driscoll and directed by Nicole Rubio. The episode focuses on the show's protagonist Meredith Grey's (Ellen Pompeo) past and troubled childhood and her relationship with her mother world-renowned surgeon Ellis Grey (Kate Burton) and Richard Webber (James Pickens Jr.) while she struggles in her marriage with Derek Shepherd (Patrick Dempsey). On its initial airing it was watched by 8.43 million viewers and received universal acclaim from television critics with many calling it one of the best episodes of the entire series.

Secrets from Ellis Grey's past come to light when Meredith watches old videos and reads through her mother's journals. Meanwhile, Maggie Pierce (Kelly McCreary) rocks the hospital with an unexpected announcement. Alex Karev (Justin Chambers) finds Arizona Robbins (Jessica Capshaw), who tells him to check up on one of her patients. She's swamped as Nicole Herman (Geena Davis) keeps her really busy. Callie Torres (Sara Ramirez) focuses her attention on the Veterans' project. Owen Hunt (Kevin McKidd) and Miranda Bailey (Chandra Wilson) just read an e-mail from Maggie about her resigning, and they confront Jackson Avery (Jesse Williams) about it.

Plot
In a series of flashbacks, Meredith and Richard manage to come to terms with their past relationships with Ellis. In order to sort out the new revelation of having a half-sister, Meredith goes searching through her mother's diaries and video footage. Alex learns that the board's vote to replace Cristina was not as close as Arizona led him to believe. In fact, the vote was unanimously in favor of Bailey. He confronts Arizona about her lie, and she confides in him that she did not vote for him because she wanted to hire him as the new pediatrics attending so she could take a step back and focus on the fetal surgery fellowship, and to save her marriage. Bailey finds out from Richard who Maggie really is when she tries to reverse Maggie's decision to leave Grey Sloan Memorial Hospital.

Meredith learns from Richard that the day at the carousel was the day he left Ellis for good. He only stayed with Adele because of his hatred and jealousy of Ellis' first Harper Avery award nomination for the Grey Method. Before Richard could tell Adele the truth, he found himself thinking that he would spend his entire life feeling like this, being in Ellis’ shadow. And as a result, Ellis went home and attempted suicide.

Derek then finds his way back to Meredith, where he puts a halt on their fighting. Mer tries to fight even that, but he stands by his truce because she has a sister and he needs to know that she's okay. Meredith finally calms down enough to recall the memory of her mother being pregnant. She remembers how Ellis’ water broke on the kitchen floor and how it scared her because it reminded her of her mother's suicide attempt. She remembers Ellis moving them across town after giving birth and how, afterward, Ellis started her fellowship and Meredith started first grade.

So before Maggie can leave, Meredith asks to show her something. She pulls out Ellis’ journal from 1983 and shows Maggie what she can. Ellis wasn't a warm person, but the journal showed wine stains from when Ellis would write her thoughts every night. And around the time Ellis figured out she was pregnant, the wine stains stopped and were replaced with lists of everything Ellis ate that day. It's not much but it's enough to show she wanted the baby to be healthy. Ellis Grey tried. And that's a new memory Meredith can add to her list, because as she puts it, memories are “our most valuable possessions. They made us who we are.” leading Meredith to have a change of heart about Maggie.

Production

During an interview, Shonda Rhimes stated that "Season 11 is really a Meredith-centric season. She lost her ‘person’, her half-sister has shown up, her husband is chafing to go someplace else..." She went on to reveal that she's been wanting to do the "familial grenade" storyline for a long time, and at the end of Season 10, she knew it was the time to do it. In another interview discussing this storyline, Rhimes revealed that she and the writers are thinking about doing flashback periods to the younger days of Ellis Grey and Richard Webber.

At first, it was uncertain who would play the younger Ellis, as there have been two different actresses who played Ellis within the relatively same period: Kate Burton and Sarah Paulson. However, on August 6, 2014, it was confirmed that Kate Burton will portray the character in flashbacks in the season premiere.

Despite this confirmation, on September 25, 2014, it was announced that Kate Burton, who played present day Ellis Grey in previous seasons of Grey's before her character died, was supposed to appear in the season 11 premiere in flashbacks, but her scenes have been cut from the episode. She is still slated to appear in flashbacks later in the season, and Sally Pressman (Army Wives) would play the role of Ellis. The role, previously played by American Horror Story's Sarah Paulson in flashbacks in season six. According to TVLine, Paulson's AHS: Freak Show shooting schedule conflicted with returning to Grey's, so she was unable to reprise her role. J. August Richards will reprise his role as a young Richard Webber.

Reception

Broadcast
The episode aired on October 16, 2014 on American Broadcasting Company (ABC) in the United States. On its initial release the episode was watched by 8.43 million viewers and garnered a 2.4/8 Nielsen ratings and ranked no. 22 in 18-49 key demographic and was the 8th most watched drama.

Reviews
The episode opened up to universal acclaim with numerous critics calling it "one of the best of Grey's". TV Fanatic also lauded the episode saying, "I don't think I've ever appreciated an episode like the way I did with Only Mama Knows, Well done, Shonda Rhimes and co. I loved every bit of it. I thought that this installment was incredible. I found it fascinating and really thought it fit well for a Throwback Thursday kind of night."

Examiner gave the episode rave reviews praising the entire premise, "Grey’s Anatomy aired the beautifully written and played all-new episode “Only Mama Knows” on Oct. 16. Through exceptional use of flashback, Meredith finally remembers that her mother was pregnant following her attempt to commit suicide. These repressed memories that resurface are very sad. Meredith Grey endured two terribly traumatic experiences at a very young age. No wonder she is a complicated, dark and twisty adult. The editing on this episode is extraordinary. Using old clips of Ellis to tell a new story was simply brilliant and totally upped the emotional stakes for Meredith, Richard (James Pickens, Jr.), and Maggie (Kelly McCreary) moving forward.

Entertainment Weekly called it "great drama" stating, "It was also throwing us back to the type of episode we expected from this show in the early seasons, the type of episode that gave you chills and reminded you why this show is so good at drama." and added, "If this is what we can expect from a “Season of Meredith Grey,” then count me in. Seriously."

Screenspy said that the episode ranks up there with all the other "Grey’s classics" adding, "Only Mama Knows was so good I kept checking my watch to see if this really was the eleventh year of the doc drama that keeps on ticking, Grey’s Anatomy. In one of the best episodes of the series, not just season, this installment gave us glimpses of Meredith’s mixed up, complicated past with mixed up, complicated mom, Ellis Grey. BuddyTV said that "the veteran drama is on a roll" adding, "In a superbly crafted episode (is ), this week's Grey's Anatomy, "Only Mama Knows," explores the idea of memory, which is both notoriously unreliable and incredibly subjective." lowly but surely, Meredith gains a fuller understanding not only of what happened so long ago, but also begins to ponder the ongoing ramifications of the choices made both by Ellis Grey and by Richard Webber.

TVEquals praised the episode and Pompeo saying, "Last night’s episode of Grey’s Anatomy was entertaining and served as a useful reminder of how well adjusted Meredith Grey is, despite some of the challenges of her childhood." The site added, "The pacing of this storyline continues to be exceptional and the actors have done a great job with the material. I liked the writers gradual, but efficient approach at exposing more people to the Maggie/Meredith/Richard secret. It’s hard to decide which I liked more – Meredith sharing the journal or Derek giving his sister-in-law a hearty hug." also praising the guest actors, "Kate Burton is always great on whatever show’s she’s appearing, and Sally Pressman portraying younger Ellis was solid as well. The Huffington Post wrote, "I will not even try to expound on the construction of this episode and how well they brought back Kate Burton, fit in the flashbacks, and made me feel sympathy for Meredith again." lauding Patrick Dempsey and Ellen Pompeo, "Those Derek and Meredith showdowns! She tells him where to go, and finally stands up for herself, taking Cristina's "be the sun" advice. In the end, they are each other's people and he nudges her along in accepting Maggie."

Fempop too called the episode one of Grey's' best stating, "This episode doesn’t bluff. It’s holding at least three of a kind. Like some of the best episodes of the show “Only Mama Knows” is focused. Characters not necessary to the central story are minimized Owen Hunt, Jackson Avery or cut all together Callie Torres, April Kepner. The rest of the characters are engaged in a dance, circling the central issue of Maggie's impending departure and her parentage and Meredith's own struggle with the expectations of her husband and her long dead mother."

References

Grey's Anatomy (season 11) episodes
2014 American television episodes